Terre Haute Fire Station No. 8 is a historic fire station located at Terre Haute, Vigo County, Indiana. It was built in 1906, and is a two-story, Romanesque Revival style brick building on a dressed limestone base.  It served as a fire station until 1972.

It was listed on the National Register of Historic Places in 2000.

References

Fire stations on the National Register of Historic Places in Indiana
Romanesque Revival architecture in Indiana
Fire stations completed in 1906
Buildings and structures in Terre Haute, Indiana
National Register of Historic Places in Terre Haute, Indiana
1906 establishments in Indiana